Thinking Huts is an American nonprofit organization founded in 2015 by Maggie Grout, which is on a mission to increase global access to education by leveraging humanitarian-driven technology solutions to build schools in partnership with communities in developing countries where they are needed most. According to the organization, it built Madagascar's first 3D printed school - the second school built this way in the world. The organization aims to first address the classroom shortage throughout the African continent by building more schools. According to UNICEF, there is a learning crisis where 1.6 billion children are at risk of falling behind due to school closures and insufficient space to learn. Schools are needed for students who are prevented from obtaining an education due to overcrowding and long travel distances.

Origins 

The founder and current CEO, Maggie Grout, was adopted from rural China at a young age, and founded the company when she was fifteen years old. She understood what poverty looked like firsthand and saw the need for access to education in order to address the root of increasing generational opportunity.
 Grout was born in Dawu County, Hubei, China, on September 2, 1999. She grew up in Denver, Colorado, and Richmond, London, United Kingdom. 
She attended the University of Colorado Boulder and graduated from their Leeds School of Business.

History 

Thinking Huts is supported by Sobrato Philanthropies.

Guidestar, a charity evaluator, awarded Thinking Huts the silver seal of transparency in 2021. Fast Company recognized the nonprofit in 2021 as a World Changing Idea.

References 

Non-profit organizations based in the United States
2015 establishments in the United States
501(c)(3) organizations
3D printing